Boinville-en-Mantois is a commune in the Yvelines department in north-central France.

Geography

The commune is bordered by Mézières-sur-Seine and Guerville from the north, Goussonville from the east and by Arnouville-lès-Mantes from the south-west.

See also
Communes of the Yvelines department

References

Communes of Yvelines
Yvelines communes articles needing translation from French Wikipedia